Nexus: the Infinite City is a role-playing game designed by Jose Garcia and published by Daedalus Games. Its setting is a meta-city made up of reality chunks of various realities of the megaverse.

Setting

Nexus: The Infinite City takes place in a city called Nexus.  Player characters can fill many roles within the city, from violent enforcers to capitalistic thirds.  The city itself is made of chunks of other cities from many worlds and dimensions.  Some are cut off entirely from their home reality, while others have only a few connections to Nexus.  Interfaces connect the different realities of Nexus, and frequently phase in and out.  As a result, many Nexans have irregular and erratic lives.

The primary core of Nexus play is Angel City, a Los Angeles separated from Earth in 1993 and wholly subsumed into Nexus.  Shortly after its incorporation, the Los Angeles government collapsed.  Los Angeles was then renamed Angel City, and has since been carved up between numerous factions and powers within Nexus.

Each reality follows its own natural laws of physics.  Some technology works in certain realities, and magic is particular to some realities as well.

System

Nexus' system is the precursor to Feng Shui, a game later written by Robin Laws.  Character attributes are split between three categories:  Body, Mind, and Reflexes.  Skills add to a character's capability in a category.  Powers are broadly defined and allow for characters to have diverse power styles; the game includes three such systems, Nexan Sorcery, Rhyming Magic, and Psychic Powers.  A list of modifiers and sample spells allows players to create more powers and frameworks.

Rolling challenges in the game requires 2D6.  Like Feng Shui, one die gives a positive number and the other a negative.  The final number - a combination of the character's level in a skill or power and the 2D6 roll - is compared to a target number to determine success or failure.

References

External links
 RPGnet listing for Nexus: the Infinite City
 Pen&Paper listing for Nexus: the Infinite City
 Nexus: the Infinite City PBeM & wiki

Canadian role-playing games
Role-playing games introduced in 1994
Universal role-playing games